Catalina María del Sagrado Corazón Fernández-Veró Vela (born August 2, 1944) is a Mexican television presenter, journalist, producer, and actress. She has hosted and written for numerous television programs for many years.

Biography
Talina Fernández was born in Mexico City in 1944, the daughter of Jorge Fernández-Veró and Catalina Vela Alcaráz. She went to study in the United States at a very young age.

She married Gerardo Levy, with whom she had three children, among them the entertainer Mariana Levy, who died from cardiac arrest in 2005.

After her separation from Levy, she married politician  in 1981. They divorced in 2015, after Fernández alleged infidelity on his part.

Career
In 1972, she began her career as an actress, with a special appearance on the telenovela Las gemelas. In 1977, she was a guest star on another telenovela, Caras y gestos. She has participated in two other telenovelas – Muchachita in 1985 (as a co-star) and Tenías que ser tú in 1992.

She has been the host of various specials, such as the Academy Awards, beauty pageants, and sports programs.

Fernández has produced several television programs, including Vi, video y vencí (1988) and Gana video (1989). She also produced the TV movie Buscando a la niña Heidi in 1988.

Throughout her career, she has hosted several programs, including Nuestras realidades, Rim Bom Video, Taliníssima, ¿Qué crees?, Nuestra Casa, Hasta en las mejores familias, and Hoy.

She was a presenter of the Teletón broadcasts in 1997, 2000, 2001, and 2002. She has participated and contributed to other programs such as Bailando por la boda de tus sueños in 2006, Big Brother VIP: Mexico in 2004, 100 mexicanos dijeron in 2005, and the 2007 Premios TVyNovelas.

In 2003, she headed Nuestra casa with El Coque Muñiz, her daughter Mariana Levy, Claudia Lizaldi, and Carmen Muñoz. She has participated in several documentaries, including  (2000), Historias engarzadas: Sonia Infante (2006), and one in honor of her daughter, Un recuerdo para Mariana Levy (2006).

That same year, a meningeal tumor was detected in her head, which was successfully removed via surgery. In 2009, she had a supporting role in the series Adictos, where she played Lulú.

Since 2016, she has appeared on Hoy, in the segment "Te voy a contar una historia" (I am going to tell you a story). In February 2017 she stated that a new, inoperable tumor had been detected in her head.

She has been involved in several public disputes with Ariel López Padilla and José María "El Pirru" Fernández, both ex-husbands of her deceased daughter.

References

External links
 
 

1944 births
Actresses from Mexico City
Living people
Mexican telenovela actresses
Mexican television journalists
Mexican television presenters
Mexican television producers
Mexican women journalists
Women television producers
Women television journalists
Mexican women television presenters